USS George H. Johnson (SP-379) was the proposed name and designation for a freight lighter that the United States Navy considered for World War I naval service but never acquired.
 
George H. Johnson was built as a commercial freight lighter in 1912 by W. G. Abbott at Milford, Delaware. She was the property of the T. Johnson Company of New York City when the U.S. Navy inspected her in 1916 or early 1917 for possible naval use during World War I. The Navy assigned her the section patrol number SP-379 but never acquired her, and she saw no naval service.

References
NavSource Online: Section Patrol Craft Photo Archive: George H. Johnson (SP-379) 

Cancelled ships of the United States Navy
Ships built in Milford, Delaware
1912 ships